Great Harbour Deep was an incorporated town in the province of Newfoundland and Labrador, Canada, situated on the east coast of the Great Northern Peninsula. Harbour Deep, as it is customarily called, is a logging and fishing community that lies in a sheltered harbour on the south shore of Pigeonnière Arm. It was once known as Orange Bay or Baie L'Orange.

Orange Bay or Great Harbour Deep was a French fishing station and it had appeared on Samuel de Champlain's map of 1612 as Baye dorge. It has gone through many name changes as noted on mapping at various years as noted;
 1613 b doringe
 1621 Havor Dorin
 1653 B d'orge
 c.1680 B Dorange
 1689 Harbor Dorin
 1699 Baie d'Orge
 1715 Harbour Deep and Bay de Orge

Residents voted to resettle in 2002. It cost the province $3.8 million to relocate the residents, according to government documents. That $3.8 million was recovered in four years, through savings in services which were no longer necessary once the town was shuttered. Those services included the local school and ferry that linked the town to Jackson's Arm. However, the $3.8 million total does not include any pending or future settlement amounts. Although the $3.8 million was no longer spent on/in Great Harbour Deep, the province still incurred education and medical expenses related to those residents now settled in other towns.

In 2018, Baccalieu Media Inc produced a one-hour documentary about the resettlement of this town for CBC's Absolutely Canadian documentary series  called "Great Harbour Deep", profiling town residents before the move, and revisiting the ghost town  and the residents 15 years later. The documentary features the last "Running of the Goat" in Great Harbour Deep, a traditional dance that was born in the town.

See also
 List of communities in Newfoundland and Labrador
 Resettlement (Newfoundland)

References

Former towns in Newfoundland and Labrador
Populated coastal places in Canada
Ghost towns in Newfoundland and Labrador